Robert Carey may refer to:

 Robert Carey (died 1583), MP for Barnstaple
 Robert Carey, 1st Earl of Monmouth (c. 1560–1639), English nobleman and MP
 Robert Carey (Major-General) (1821–1883), British Army officer
 Robert D. Carey (1878–1937), 11th Governor of Wyoming
 Robert T. Carey (fl. 1848), Whig member of the Wisconsin State Assembly

See also
 Robert Cary (disambiguation)
 Bob Carey (disambiguation)